Stéphane Mifsud is a French free diver born 13 August 1971 in Istres (Bouches-du-Rhône). He is five times world champion in static apnea (breath holding). His lung capacity was measured at 10.5 litres.

His surname, Mifsud, is of Maltese origin.

Personal best 
 Static apnea: 11 minutes 35 seconds on 8 June 2009 (AIDA World Record at the time)
 Dynamic apnea without fins - 131 m
 Dynamic apnea with fins - 213 m

References

1971 births
French freedivers
Living people